The 2016 Penrith Panthers season was the 50th in the club's history. Coached by Anthony Griffin and captained by Matt Moylan, the Panthers competed in the NRL's 2016 Telstra Premiership. They also competed in the 2016 NRL Auckland Nines pre-season tournament.

The Panthers started their season with a string of close results, but failed to win consecutive games during the competition's opening two months. Over the course of the year, new coach Anthony Griffin redefined who was already well established within the team, and experienced playmakers Jamie Soward and James Segeyaro would later be released from their contracts mid-season. The Panthers finished the regular season with seven wins from their final eight games, securing 6th position and a place in the finals series.

Jersey and Sponsors 
The Panthers' 2016 jersey, made by ASICS, was designed to commemorate the club's 50th season. The names of all those who have played 50 or more games for the club adorn the front of the jersey, while the back of the jersey features all five of the Panthers logos, past and present. Unlike the black and teal colour combination used in previous seasons, the Panthers adopted a black and golden brown colour scheme in 2016. The home jersey is black with golden brown panels and the away jersey is the inverse. OAK Milk again featured as the major sponsor, with Hertz once more on the sleeve.

On three occasions during the season, the Panthers wore unique heritage jerseys to celebrate the club's history. The celebratory jerseys were based on jersey designs from previous seasons, but were remade in the style of the current jerseys. The 1967 heritage jersey, worn against the Canterbury-Bankstown Bulldogs in round 2, was based on the club's 'Chocolate Soldiers' jersey from their inaugural 1967 season. The 1991 heritage jersey, worn against the Canberra Raiders in round 9, was based on the jersey worn during the club's premiership winning 1991 season. Likewise, the 2003 heritage jersey, worn against the Sydney Roosters in round 22, was based on the jersey worn during the club's premiership winning 2003 season. Listed on each of the jerseys is the names of all those who played for the club in that respective season.

Squad

Player transfers 
A † denotes that the transfer occurred during the 2016 season.

Fixtures

Auckland Nines

Pre-season

Regular season

Finals

Ladder

Statistics

Other teams
In addition to competing in the National Rugby League, the Panthers also fielded semi-professional teams in the National Youth Competition's 2016 Holden Cup (for players aged under 20) and the New South Wales Rugby League's 2016 Intrust Super Premiership (NSW Cup). The NYC team was coached by Cameron Ciraldo and captained by Oliver Clark, and the NSW Cup team was coached by Steve Georgallis and captained by Zach Dockar-Clay.

Representative

Domestic

International 

1 – Selected as 18th Man, Cartwright did not play during the series.
2 – Hiku was initially selected to play but was ruled out by injury.
3 – Blake did not play in the match, despite being named in the original squad.
4 – Fisher-Harris was called up to replace injured Simon Mannering.

References 

Penrith Panthers seasons
Penrith Panthers season